is a 2014 Japanese jidaigeki film directed by Setsurō Wakamatsu. It was released on September 20, 2014.

Cast
Kiichi Nakai as Kingo Shimura
Hiroshi Abe as Jūbei Sahashi
Ryōko Hirosue as Setsu Shimura
Masahiro Takashima as Shinnosuke Naitō
Sei Matobu
Eisaku Yoshida
Yuria Kizaki
Masane Tsukayama
Tatsuya Fuji
Nakamura Kichiemon II as Naosuke Ii

Reception
The film received four nominations at the 38th Japan Academy Prize: Outstanding Performance by an Actor in a Leading Role (Kiichi Nakai), Outstanding Performance by an Actor in a Supporting Role (Hiroshi Abe), Outstanding Achievement in Art Direction (Fumio Ogawa) and Outstanding Achievement in Sound Recording (Osamu Onodera).

References

External links
 

2010s historical films
Films directed by Setsurō Wakamatsu
Jidaigeki films
Films set in Bakumatsu
2010s Japanese films